Naša mala klinika (Our Little Clinic) was a Slovenian comedy series broadcast by Pop TV respectively, between 2004 and 2007. Seven seasons were broadcast. The series was written by Marko Pokorn, Rok Vilčnik and Branko Đurić "Đuro", who also directed the series. The show won four (2005, 2006, 2007, 2008) viktors for the best played TV series. In Slovenia, it was the most watched TV series in 2007 season and some seasons before.

Cast (slovenians) 
The Slovenian cast:

The Croatian cast:
 Ranko Zidarić - Franjo Slaviček (Seasons 1-4)
 Bojana Gregorić - Lili Štriga Slaviček (Seasons 1-2; 3-4)
 Igor Mešin - Milan "Mile" Car (Seasons 1-4)
 Enis Bešlagić - Šemsudin Dino "Šemso" Poplava (Seasons 1-4)
 Ivica Vidović - Ante Guzina (Seasons 1-4)
 Goran Navojec - Toni Grgeč (Seasons 1-4)
 Dubravka Ostojić - Sanja Grospić (Seasons 1-4)
 Rene Bitorajac - Veljko Kunić (Seasons 1-4)
 Jadranka Đokić - Helga (Seasons 1-4)
 Filip Šovagović - Ivo Zadro (Seasons 1-4)
 Damir Lončar - Florijan Gavran (Seasons 2-4)
 Filip Nola - Bogo Moljka (Seasons 3-4)

The Serbian cast:
 Mladen Nelević - Sreten Pejević Pejo (Seasons 1-3)
 Rene Bitorajac - Dr. Veljko Zec (Seasons 1-3)
 Srdjan Miletić - Veselin Ribar Veso (Seasons 1-3)
 Miodrag Fiseković - Dr. Momčilo Šaranović Šaran (Seasons 1-3)
 Slobodan Ninković - Dr. Mirko Vrabac (Seasons 1-3)
 Boro Stjepanović - Dr. Jovan Guzina (Seasons 1-3)
 Sonja Damjanović - Sestra Mira (Seasons 1-3)
 Neda Arnerić - Sanja Popić (Seasons 1-3)
 Tanja Ribič - Dr. Lili Muha (Seasons 1-3)
 Svetislav Goncić - Cvetko Novak (Seasons 2-3)
 Jan Pance Lah  - Lepomir Kralj (Seasons 2-3)

Episodes
The Original Slovenian Episodes

Croatian version 

112 episodes
<onlyinclude>

Serbian version

75 episodes

Sezona 1

Sezona 2

Sezona 3

Sezona 4

Sezona 5

Sezona 6

Sezona 7

References

External links

Slovenian television series
2000s Croatian television series
2000s Serbian television series
Medical television series
Croatian comedy television series
2004 Croatian television series debuts
Serbian comedy television series
2000s Slovenian television series 
2004 Slovenian television series debuts 
2007 Slovenian television series endings
Pop (Slovenian TV channel) original programming